Hackney Road is a London arterial route running from Shoreditch Church in London Borough of Hackney to Cambridge Heath in the London Borough of Tower Hamlets. The route runs along the northern edge of Bethnal Green and southern edge of Hoxton and Haggerston. It lies close to the border between the boroughs of London Boroughs of Hackney and Tower Hamlets. 

In recent years, Hackney Road has begun to experience the gentrification of nearby Columbia Road or Broadway Market. Despite this, a number of derelict buildings still remain, including the empty Children's Hospital. The road also has striptease venues such as Browns and The Olde Axe (Clifton 2002), a bingo hall, fast-food outlets and building sites. Hackney City Farm is located at the junction of (intersection with) Goldsmith's Row on the northern (Hackney) side of the road. Next to the farm is Haggerston Park.

In 2008 a 178-room Days Hotel London Shoreditch opened at the junction with Pritchard's Road. This has since become the RE Hotel London Shoreditch.

Transport 
Hackney Road is served by the London bus 26 and 55. Cambridge Heath station is situated at the east end of Hackney Road, at the junction with Cambridge Heath Road. The west end of Hackney Road is served by London Overground services from Hoxton railway station.

July 2005 bombings

On 21 July 2005 at 13:30 BST a small explosion occurred on the Number 26 bus travelling from Waterloo to Hackney Wick, on Hackney Road at the corner with Columbia Road. There were no fatalities in the explosion.

References 
Clifton, L. (2002) Baby Oil and Ice: Striptease in East London. The Do-Not Press Limited: London.
Harrison, P. (1985) Inside the Inner City: Life Under the Cutting Edge. Penguin: Harmondsworth.

External links
London Borough of Hackney

 

Streets in the London Borough of Hackney
Streets in the London Borough of Tower Hamlets